Corning Municipal Airport  is located one mile northeast of Corning, in Tehama County, California, United States. The National Plan of Integrated Airport Systems for 2011–2015 categorized it as a general aviation facility.

Facilities
The airport covers 77 acres (31 ha) at an elevation of 293 feet (89 m). Its one runway, 17/35, is 2,702 by 50 feet (824 x 15 m) asphalt.

In 2011 the airport had 8,718 aircraft operations, average 23 per day: 99% general aviation and 1% air taxi. 23 aircraft were then based at this airport: 74% single-engine and 26% ultralight.

References

External links 
 Airport Commission at City of Corning website
 Aerial image as of August 1998 from USGS The National Map

Airports in Tehama County, California